The 2008 United States presidential election in Nevada was part of the 2008 United States presidential election, which took place on November 4, 2008, throughout all 50 states and D.C. Voters chose five representatives, or electors to the Electoral College, who voted for president and vice president.

Democrat Barack Obama defeated Republican John McCain by 12.5 percentage points. Both candidates heavily campaigned in the state.  Obama almost always led in polls, however some argued that McCain, a nationally prominent Senator from neighboring Arizona, had a legitimate chance of pulling off an upset in Nevada. In that vein, most news organizations considered Obama to be the favorite in the state, while many still viewed it as a relative swing state. In the previous four presidential elections, the margin of victory in Nevada had always been below 5 percentage points. George W. Bush carried the state twice in 2000 and 2004 while Bill Clinton won it in 1992 and in 1996. Obama became the first Democrat to win a majority of Nevada's vote since Lyndon B. Johnson in 1964. This also remains the only time since 1964 that a Democrat has carried the state by a double-digit margin.

As of the 2020 presidential election, this is the last time a Democratic candidate won Carson City. This is also the last time a Democrat has won more than two counties in the state.

Primaries
 2008 Nevada Republican caucuses
 2008 Nevada Democratic caucuses

Campaign

Predictions
There were 16 news organizations who made state-by-state predictions of the election. Here are their last predictions before election day:

Polling

In the beginning of the general election, it was a dead heat. McCain did win several polls. However, since September 30, Obama swept every other poll taken in the state and tied one poll. The final 3 polls averaged 50% to 44% in favor of Obama. On election day, Obama won the state with 55% and by a double-digit margin of victory, a much better performance than polls showed.

Fundraising
John McCain raised a total of $1,980,771 in the state. Barack Obama raised $2,328,659.

Advertising and visits
Obama and his interest groups spent $9,622,022. McCain and his interest groups spent $6,184,427. Each campaign visited the state 7 times.

Analysis
Nevada is historically somewhat of a bellwether state, having voted for the winner of every presidential election since 1912 except in 1976 and 2016. In 2008, McCain of neighboring Arizona was leading most polls taken March until the end of September (around the time of the 2008 financial crisis), when Obama of Illinois started taking the lead in almost every poll conducted from the beginning of October on, some in double digits. The subprime mortgage crisis hit Nevada hard, and McCain's statement that "the fundamentals of the economy are strong" apparently hurt him in a state devastated by the economic meltdown.

Obama ultimately carried the Silver State by a 12.5-point margin, larger than most polls anticipated. His victory rested almost entirely on winning the state's three largest jurisdictions: Clark County, home to Las Vegas; Washoe County, which contains Reno; and the independent city of Carson City, which combine for 88% of Nevada's total population. Hispanics also played a large role in Obama's landslide victory. According to exit polling, they composed 15% of voters in Nevada and broke for Obama by a three-to-one margin. With their support, Obama carried Washoe County by a comfortable 12-point margin and a somewhat narrower one-point margin in Carson City.  These two areas hadn't gone Democratic since Lyndon B. Johnson won them in 1964. Obama also won Clark County by double digits, the first time a Democrat did so since 1964. McCain ran up huge margins in most of the more rural counties, which have been solidly Republican ever since Richard Nixon's 1968 win. However, it was not nearly enough to overcome his deficit in Clark, Washoe and Carson City. Indeed, Obama's 122,000-vote margin in Clark County would have been enough by itself to carry the state, and Nevada voted more Democratic than the nation as a whole for the first time since 1960 and second since 1944.

At the same time, Democrats picked up a U.S. House seat in Nevada's 3rd Congressional District, which is based in Clark County and consists of most of the Las Vegas suburbs. Democratic State Senator Dina Titus defeated incumbent Republican Jon Porter by 5.14 points with several third parties receiving a small but significant proportion of the total statewide vote. At the state level, Democrats picked up one seat in the Nevada Assembly and picked up two seats in the Nevada Senate, giving the Democrats control of both chambers of the Nevada Legislature for the first time in decades.

As of the 2020 presidential election, this is the last time that Carson City voted for the Democratic candidate. This is the most recent election that Nevada trended more Democratic than the previous one.

Results

By county

Counties and independent cities that flipped from Republican to Democratic
 Carson City
 Washoe (largest municipality: Reno)

By congressional district
Barack Obama carried 2 of the state's 3 congressional districts.

Electors

Technically the voters of Nevada cast their ballots for electors: representatives to the Electoral College. Nevada is allocated 5 electors because it has 3 congressional districts and 2 senators. All candidates who appear on the ballot or qualify to receive write-in votes must submit a list of 5 electors, who pledge to vote for their candidate and his or her running mate. Whoever wins the majority of votes in the state is awarded all 5 electoral votes. Their chosen electors then vote for president and vice president. Although electors are pledged to their candidate and running mate, they are not obligated to vote for them. An elector who votes for someone other than his or her candidate is known as a faithless elector.

The electors of each state and the District of Columbia met on December 15, 2008, to cast their votes for president and vice president. The Electoral College itself never meets as one body. Instead the electors from each state and the District of Columbia met in their respective capitols.

The following were the members of the Electoral College from the state. All 5 were pledged to Barack Obama and Joe Biden:
Maggie Carlton
Tahis Castro
Ruby Duncan
Ron Hibble
Theresa Navarro

See also
United States presidential elections in Nevada

References

Nevada
2008
2008 Nevada elections